Dunmow railway station was a station serving Great Dunmow, Essex.

History
The railway line through Dunmow was built by the Bishop's Stortford, Dunmow and Braintree Railway (BSD&BR). The line, including Dunmow station, was opened on 22 February 1869, and on the same day the BSD&BR company was absorbed by the Great Eastern Railway.

Regular services ended on 3 March 1952, but the station was not formally closed to passengers until after August 1961. It closed to goods on 1 April 1969. The site and trackbed have been used for the B1256 Dunmow Bypass and no trace of the railway remains.

Route

References

Further reading

External links
 Dunmow station on navigable 1946 O. S. map

Disused railway stations in Essex
Former Great Eastern Railway stations
Railway stations in Great Britain opened in 1869
Railway stations in Great Britain closed in 1952
1869 establishments in England
Great Dunmow